Delicacies Destiny is a Chinese streaming television series produced by Huanyu Film and Television. The series premiered in Mainland China on Bilibili on April 7, 2022. Internationally, the series is available on Disney+ in selected countries.

Plot 
The Chinese series „Delicacies Destiny“ centers on the young and talented cook Ling Xiaoxiao. The crown prince of the imperial palace, Zhu Shoukui, begins to take an interest in her and grants her a position at court. But in a scheming and begrudging environment, it is not easy for Ling to hold her own.

Cast 
 He Ruixian as Ling Xiaoxiao
 Lv Chenyue as young Ling Xiaoxiao 
 Wang Xingyue as Crown prince Zhu Shoukui
 Anson Shi as young Crown prince Zhu Shoukui
 Pan Binlong as Emperor
 Liu Min as Empress
 Ji Jiahe	as Concubine Li
 Zang Hongna as Mingmei
 Guan Le as Xiyan
 Ennazhuli as Chunchan
 Feng Man as Prince Jin
 Wang Yikun as young Prince Jin
 Lou Zibo as Prince An
 Jin Xuze	as young Prince An
 Bu Guangjin as Jiang Yunnuo
 Xiang Xia	 as Zheng Li
 Liu Beishi as Lu Yunzhou
 Gua Tong as Shen Yitao
 Zhang Lei as Guan Yidao
 Wang Yu as Gao Zicheng
 Jiang Yutao as Chancellor Li
 Tong Yao as Leyao
 Zhang Tingting as Madame Gu
 Zhang Hongbin as Eunuch Fu
 Zhang Gong as Jiang Tao
 Wang Longxin as Songbai
 Jackie Li	as Princess
 Zhou Dawei as Consort
 Chen Hongan as Medical attendant
 Di Sun as Wang
 Liu Guhao as Chen Yongkang

Episodes

References

External links 
 
 Delicacies Destiny on Bilibili
 

Chinese historical television series
Chinese web series
2022 Chinese television series debuts
2022 Chinese television series endings
2022 web series debuts
2022 web series endings
Television series by Huanyu Film
Bilibili